Ballyclough GAA is a Gaelic Athletic Association club based in the parish of Ballyclough, County Cork, Ireland. The club fields teams in competitions organized by the Cork GAA county board and the Avondhu GAA divisional board.

Achievements
 North Cork Junior A Football Championship Winners (5) 2004, 2005, 2012, 2015, 2016
 Cork Junior B Hurling Championship: Winners (1) 2014

Notable players
 Colm O'Neill

References

External sources
 Avondhu Divisional website

Gaelic games clubs in County Cork
Gaelic football clubs in County Cork
Hurling clubs in County Cork